Denmark was represented by Gry Johansen, with the song "Kloden drejer", at the 1983 Eurovision Song Contest, which took place on 23 April in Munich. "Kloden drejer" was chosen as the Danish entry at the Dansk Melodi Grand Prix on 5 March.

Before Eurovision

Dansk Melodi Grand Prix 1983 
The Dansk Melodi Grand Prix 1983 was held at the DR TV studios in Copenhagen, hosted by Jørgen Mylius. Ten songs took part with the winner being decided by voting from five regional juries.

The 1983 contest also saw the first DMGP appearance of Kirsten Siggaard who, as a member of Hot Eyes and as a solo singer, would become a familiar face at DMGP and Eurovision for years to come. John Hatting had been a member of the previous year's Danish representatives Brixx.

At Eurovision 
On the night of the final Johansen performed 15th in the running order, following Germany and preceding Cyprus. Johansen's vocals were noticeably off-key at the start of the song, and continued to veer out of tune throughout; clips from the performance are frequently used in montages put together to illustrate Eurovision vocal faux pas. Johansen was criticised for having paid too much attention to choreography and not enough to the song. At the close of voting "Kloden drejer" had received 16 points, placing Denmark 17th of the 20 entries. The result continued a run of undistinguished placements for Denmark since their return to Eurovision in 1978, with only one top 10 finish in six attempts. The Danish jury awarded its 12 points to Yugoslavia.

Voting

References 

1983
Countries in the Eurovision Song Contest 1983
Eurovision